Bingham is an unincorporated community in Greenbrier County, West Virginia, United States.

An early variant name was Rimmon.

References

Unincorporated communities in Greenbrier County, West Virginia
Unincorporated communities in West Virginia